Tinley is a surname. Notable people with the surname include:
 Adam Tinley (born 1967), known as Adamski, English DJ, musician, singer and record producer
 Cris Tinley (1830–1900), English cricketer, one of the best slow bowlers of his time
 Mark Tinley (born 1963), British guitarist, programmer, sound engineer and record producer
 Peter Tinley (born 1962), Australian soldier and politician
 Scott Tinley (born 1956), former professional triathlete and twice winner of the Hawaii Ironman endurance race

See also
 Tinley Moraine, moraine around the Lake Michigan basin in North America
 Tinley Park, Illinois, village located in Cook and Will County, Illinois, United States